is a professional Japanese baseball player.

External links

 NPB.com

1988 births
Living people
People from Kamakura
Baseball people from Kanagawa Prefecture
Hosei University alumni
Japanese baseball players
Nippon Professional Baseball pitchers
Yokohama BayStars players
Yokohama DeNA BayStars players